Lloyd Sumner "Shorty" Burdick (August 8, 1909 – August 9, 1945) was an American football tackle who played three seasons in the National Football League with the Chicago Bears and Cincinnati Reds. He played college football at the University of Illinois and attended Morgan Park Military Academy in Chicago, Illinois.

College career
Burdick played for the Illinois Fighting Illini. He graduated from the school of commerce and agriculture at the University of Illinois.

Professional career

Chicago Bears
Burdick played in 22 games, starting nineteen, for the Chicago Bears from 1931 to 1932.

Cincinnati Reds
Burdick played in ten games, starting nine, for the Cincinnati Reds in 1933.

Personal life
Burdick was a district representative of the Caterpillar company. His Caterpillar company territory included North Dakota, Montana, and the provinces of Alberta and Saskatchewan, Canada. He spent 28 months as supervisor of maintenance on the Alcan highway. Burdick was one of 34 people killed in a train wreck on August 9, 1945 in Michigan, North Dakota.

Head coaching record

References

External links
 Just Sports Stats
 

1909 births
1945 deaths
20th-century American businesspeople
American football tackles
American transportation businesspeople
Caterpillar Inc. people
Chicago Bears players
Cincinnati Reds (NFL) players
Illinois Fighting Illini football players
Knox Prairie Fire football coaches
People from Assumption, Illinois
Players of American football from Illinois
Businesspeople from Illinois
Accidental deaths in North Dakota
Railway accident deaths in the United States